Shui Wo is a village in Lam Tsuen, Tai Po District, Hong Kong.

Administration
Shui Wo, including Sha Pa, is a recognized village under the New Territories Small House Policy.

History
At the time of the 1911 census, the population of Shui Wo was 92. The number of males was 41.

References

External links

 Delineation of area of existing village Shui Wo (Tai Po) for election of resident representative (2019 to 2022)

Villages in Tai Po District, Hong Kong
Lam Tsuen